The Palace of Shaki Khans in Shaki, Azerbaijan was a summer residence for the Shaki Khans. It was built in 1797 by Muhammed Hasan Khan. The palace was intended to house the Khans who were in charge of controlling Shaki, as viceroys of the ruling Zand and later Qajar Persian dynasties around 1750 until the time when these territories were annexed by the Russian Empire per treaty of Gulistan in 1813 after the Russo-Persian War (1804–1813).

The Palace of Shaki Khans was nominated for List of World Heritage Sites,  UNESCO in 1998 by Gulnara Mehmandarova — president of Azerbaijan Committee of ICOMOS—International Council on Monuments and Sites.

On 7 July 2019, the Historic Centre of Shaki with the Khan's Palace was inscribed as a UNESCO World Heritage Site.

Preservation and restoration

From 1955 to 1965 restoration was carried out in full under the supervision of Niyazi Rzaev. 
Two talented architects, Kamal Mamedbekov and Nikolai Utsyn, were involved in this work creating measurement and restoration drawings. The restoration workshop was established in the ceremonial hall on the second floor of the palace, and the rooms flanking the hall were used to accommodate the architects. The drawings developed by Mamedbekov and Utsyn formed the basis of the restoration project for the entire palace complex. 
Execution of the restoration work based on the drawings was entrusted to the artist F. Hajiyev and the shabaka master A. Rasulov.

The last total and complete restoration from 2002 - 2004 supported by the World Bank and executed under leading of a German restoration team (Uwe Henschel, Dietrich Wellmer, Elisabeth Wellmer, Andreas Lessmeister) from company "Denkmalpflege Mecklenburg GmbH" (today "Neumühler Bauhütte GmbH").

History
In 1946 Konstantinov wrote in his article "Nuha": "This Magnificent Palace — the top of luxury and taste of Persian architects, was built in 1790 by Shiraz resident Haji Zeynal Abdin".

Poet Nikolai Tikhonov, who visited the palace in 1947, described the Palace in his autobiographical story "the Roads-the trails".

"The paintings of the Khan's Palace and various patterns are well preserved, and they assure us that art was developed in ancient Nukha, and poetry and philosophy was highly appreciated."

In 1968, the historical part of Yukhari-Bash, located at Palace of Shaki Khans, was declared a historical-architectural reserve. The Palace of Shaki Khans was nominated for List of World Heritage Sites, UNESCO in 2001 by Gulnara Mehmandarova — president of Azerbaijan Committee of ICOMOS—International Council on Monuments and Sites. Director-General of UNESCO, Irina Bokova visited the Palace of Shaki Khans within the framework of official visit to Sheki on August 1, 2010.

On July 4, 2012, the 250th anniversary of the palace was celebrated in Shaki. Ambassadors of nearly 30 countries and international organizations, including figures of science, culture and art of the country, as well as members of the National Assembly took part in the ceremony.

Only a two-story palace building survived until the present time built in Shaki fortress and consisting of several buildings. Although the building has repeatedly been repaired and reconstructed since it was built, all this work didn't have a serious impact on its appearance. After the Shaki Khanate joined the Russian Empire, the palace was subordinated to the local administration and repaired repeatedly. Restoration was carried out in the palace by Hussein Khan Mushtag's grandson, poet Karim agha Fateh during 1848–1851.

“Restoration of khans palace” was discussed in Avercom plenum on April 25, 1991, and following decision was made: “Restoration of khans palace is under the responsibility of Narkomprosom according to the previous decision of Azverkom. 25 million rubles have been allocated from the budget of Narkomprosom for the repair of khan's palaces in Shusha and Shaki.” Restoration report was submitted based on the restoration project review by architect Pyotr Baranovsky in a meeting of the Commonwealth Academy of Architecture held on 13 March 1939.

Restoration work was carried out in 1950s. Art critic Valentina Antonova writes about restoration artist I.Baranov's works that, “whimsical and cheerful fighting scenes were described on wall paintings of khan’s palace belonging to XVIII century in Nukha which reminded noisy eastern markets”. Restoration work was carried out with the project and leading of architect Niyazi Rzayev during 1955–1965. During these years artist F.Hajiyev and ornamentalist A.Rasulov worked in the palace.

Restoration work started in the palace within the framework of the project on "Cultural heritage protection" in 2002.

Along with its pool and plane trees, the summer residence is the only remaining structure from the larger palatial complex inside the Shaki Khans' Fortress, which once included a winter palace, residences for the Khan's family and servants' quarters. 
It features decorative tiles, fountains and several stained-glass windows. The exterior was decorated with dark blue, turquoise and ochre tiles in geometric patterns and the murals were coloured with tempera and were inspired by the works of Nizami Ganjavi.

Measuring thirty-two meters by eight and a half meters on the exterior, the summer residence is a two-story masonry structure elongated on the north–south axis and covered with a wooden hipped roof with long eaves. The layout of both floors is identical; three rectangular rooms are placed in a row, separated by narrow, south-facing iwans that provide access to the rooms. The floors are accessed separately to accommodate their public and private functions. Entered from the south through the two iwans, the ground floor was used primarily by clerks and petitioners. Two stairways attached to the northern façade gave access to the first floor, which was reserved for the khan's family and their guests.

The summer residence is renowned for the lavish decoration of its exterior and interior. Large portions of the residence's facade, including the entire southern elevations of the central halls on both floors, are covered by a mosaic of colored glass set in a wooden latticework (shebeke) that was assembled without nails or glue. Muqarnas hoods crowning the four iwans are highlighted with gold on the lower level and covered with mirror fragments on the first floor. Remaining surfaces on all façades are decorated with floral tile panels and tile mosaics.

The interior walls of the residence are covered entirely with frescoes painted at different times during the eighteenth century. Many of the frescoes feature flowers in vases, while a series of paintings on the first floor halls depict hunting and battle scenes. Signatures on frescoes list the names of artists Ali Kuli, Kurban Kuli and Mirza Jafar from Shemaha, Usta Gambar from Shusha, and Abbas Kuli, who may also have been the architect of the summer residence.

Research 
For the first time, the Shaki Khan Palace was studied by the Department of Azerbaijan Monument Protection. Later, the Institute of History named after Bakikhanov of SSR Academy of Sciences has thoroughly investigated the monument in more detail. In the following period, the Department of Architectural Works under the Council of Ministers of the Azerbaijan SSR was involved in the study of monuments in Azerbaijan.

Early research work in the Palace was carried out with the participation of Professor Fridolin and Sharifov. In 1936, a special expert staff including Denike, Chepeleva, Weimar, and Bolotova from the Moscow State Museum of Eastern Cultures collected a lot of information about the monument.

Notes

External links 
 Historic Centre of Sheki with the Khan's Palace UNESCO collection on Google Arts and Culture

Houses completed in 1797
Palaces in Azerbaijan
Shaki, Azerbaijan
World Heritage Sites in Azerbaijan
Museums in Shaki